Michurinsky is a rural locality (a settlement) and the administrative center of Michurinskoye Rural Settlement, Bryansky District, Bryansk Oblast, Russia. Population:  2,576 (2010). There are 57 streets.

Geography 
Michurinsky is located 12 km east of Glinishchevo (the district's administrative centre) by road. Tolmachevo is the nearest rural locality.

References 

Rural localities in Bryansky District